This is a list of the current channels available on digital terrestrial television (DTT) in the United Kingdom, and those that have been removed.

Almost all channels broadcast on DTT are free-to-air, with a limited number of subscription channels (requiring a subscription to a pay-TV package) and pay-per-view channels (requiring a one-off payment to view an event) also available. Most free-to-air channels are promoted as part of the Freeview line-up.

All multiplexed H.222 transports for HDTV (1080i) channels use DVB-T2 256-QAM modulation. Local channels on the LTVmux use DVB-T QPSK modulation. All other transports for PAL (576i), radio and interactive channels use DVB-T 64-QAM modulation.

All HD channels are encoded in H.264 and subject to a MPEG-LA controlled transmission patent licensing tax which is included in the Freeview broadcaster cost and varies on viewership figures.  This tax is currently paid via one of three registered licensees: the BBC, ITV and Sky plc. The SD channels continue to use H.262, which does not incur any additional transmission costs.
 
The PSB1 transport (operating name BBC A) is used solely for the standard definition PSB (public service broadcasting) services of the BBC. The PSB2 transport (operating name D3&4) carries only standard definition versions of both the commercial broadcasters' PSB services and some of their commercial services. The PSB3 transport (operating name BBC B) is used for HDTV versions of most of the BBC and commercial PSB services. The COM4 (operating name SDN), COM5 (operating name ARQ A) and COM6 (operating name ARQ B) transports, which are only transmitted from main transmission sites, carry only standard definition commercial services.

LTVmux is a series of localised transports at certain transmitter sites carrying local and nationwide channels. Its availability is much less than that of the commercial COM transports. In addition to this, the NImux transport (operating name RNI_1) is only available in parts of Northern Ireland, and the GImux transport (operating name G_MAN) is only available in Greater Manchester.

Channel sections
Abbreviations include:
Eng = England
Scot = Scotland
NI = Northern Ireland
CI = the Channel Islands
GrLon = Greater London and surrounding areas 
GrMcr = Greater Manchester and surrounding areas
Limited = Only available to viewers using Freeview Play or with a Freeview HD TV

General Entertainment
The channel numbers on Freeview (as of 22 February 2023) are as follows:

General entertainment: Local TV variations
These regional channels are licensed by Ofcom under the Local Digital Television Programme, with That's TV currently broadcasting as a semi-national network (one which also uses the That's Christmas/That's New Year name over festive periods) with local opt-outs and a service streaming to the whole country via the VisionTV platform on channel 264 and as That's TV Gold on Freeview channel 91. Local Television Limited has eight licences in the United Kingdom branded as Local TV with the channels being a simulcast of CBS Reality for most of the day.

High-definition

Children's

News

Text services

Streamed channels
Interactive services for compatible receivers (Internet connection/compatible HD TV/box required).

Interactive
These are services that are not designed to be channels but do show up on the EPG of the majority of Freeview boxes.

Adult
These channels are not listed on Freeview's online TV Guide.

Radio stations
Unlike the TV channels, the radio stations only broadcast in audio and information displayed on the screen. Those stations also broadcast on analogue radio, Digital Audio Broadcasting and online. BBC local radio stations for England are in the section above this list, as well as those from Scotland, Wales and Northern Ireland.

Radio stations: BBC Local and Nations Radio variations
In England and the Channel Islands, up to five BBC Local Radio stations are available over DTT. Availability of these stations varies, depending on how their FM and DAB broadcast areas align with locations of DTT transmitters. In Wales, Scotland, and Northern Ireland, national radio services are broadcast in their respective nations.

Channels removed from digital terrestrial television

These are channels that have been removed from digital terrestrial television. This does not include rebranded channels or channels that have ceased broadcasting.

2001

2002

2004

2005

2006

2007

2008

2009

2010

2011

2012

2013

2014

2015

2016

2017

2018

2019

2020

2021

2022

2023

See also
Digital terrestrial television in the United Kingdom
Local television in the United Kingdom
Freeview (UK)
ITV Digital
Top Up TV

References

External links
Freeview – Channels
Digital UK – Listings
Ofcom – Current TV broadcast licensees: Digital terrestrial television

Digital
Broadcasting lists
UK

DTT